Zahirabad-e Nahr Mian (also Romanized as Z̧ahīrābād-e Nahr Mīān; also known as Z̧ahīrābād and Z̧ahīrābād-e Qūsh Tappeh) is a village in Nahr-e Mian Rural District, Zalian District, Shazand County, Markazi Province, Iran. At the 2006 census, its population was 249, in 56 families.

References 

Populated places in Shazand County